The Official Body is the third studio album by British post-punk band Shopping. It was released on 19 January 2018 through FatCat Records.

Critical reception 

The Official Body was met with generally positive reviews. At Metacritic, which assigns a normalised rating out of 100 to reviews from professional critics, the album received an average score of 76, based on 15 reviews. Tom Hull gave it an A-minus and said that the "songs are tight, clean, [and] have a rhythm and tone similar to that of such classic post-punk bands as Wire, Gang of Four, and Joy Division.

Track listing

Personnel 
The following individuals were credited with the album's production and artwork.

 Edwyn Collins — Producer
 DLT	Design — Layout
 Billy Easter — Cover Photo
 Shopping — Design, Layout, Primary Artist
 Matthew Williams — Inside Photo

References

External links 
 The Official Body on Bandcamp
 The Official Body at FatCat Records

2018 albums
Shopping (band) albums
FatCat Records albums